Partizansky District is the name of several administrative and municipal districts in Russia:
Partizansky District, Krasnoyarsk Krai, an administrative and municipal district of Krasnoyarsk Krai
Partizansky District, Primorsky Krai, an administrative and municipal district of Primorsky Krai
 Nikolayevka (air base), a naval airbase located within the district

See also
Partizansky (disambiguation)

References